Tori Anthony (born April 19, 1989) is an American pole vaulter from Woodside, California and the holder of the national indoor and outdoor records for high school women at 14' 2-1/2" (4.33 m) and 14' 1" (4.29 m) respectively.

She was originally a gymnast, but burned out on the sport and switched to track and water polo.  Competing in her first track events as a sophomore, she placed fourth in the pole vault at the 2005 CIF California State Meet within four months of taking up the sport.  Even before setting the outdoor record, she was named an "Athletes Only" indoor track athlete of the year for 2006-07, and named "best high school girl pole vaulter in the country" by Sports Illustrated. She missed her high school graduation from Castilleja School to set the outdoor record on June 2, 2007. She competed for UCLA, achieving 13' 9" in their uniform to rank number  in school history.

She was a two-time champion at the USA Junior Outdoor Track & Field Championships, winning in 2006 and 2007. She represented her country internationally at the 2006 World Junior Championships in Athletics (placing eighth in the final) and came fourth at the 2007 Pan American Junior Athletics Championships the following year. In senior national competition she was 11th at the 2007 USA Indoor Track and Field Championships and ninth at the 2007 USA Outdoor Track and Field Championships. She achieved her personal record  that year. She retired from competition in 2012 after suffering injuries.

International competitions

References

External links

Living people
1989 births
People from Woodside, California
Sportspeople from Palo Alto, California
Track and field athletes from California
American female pole vaulters
UCLA Bruins women's track and field athletes
Castilleja School alumni